Sporting Clube de Braga B, commonly known as Sporting de Braga B or just Braga B, is a Portuguese football team. It is the reserve team of S.C. Braga. Reserve teams in Portugal play in the same league system as the senior team, rather than in a reserve team league. However, they cannot play in the same division as their senior team, therefore Braga B is ineligible for promotion to the Primeira Liga and also cannot play in the Taça de Portugal and Taça da Liga.

SC Braga had a B team until the 2005–06 season where it played in the Portuguese Second Division. Prior to the end of the 2005–06 season, it was announced that Braga B would fold from the Portuguese league system along with the B teams of Benfica, Porto and Sporting. The club refounded itself in the 2012–13 season, when a new set of rules regarding B teams was introduced in Portuguese football system. For 2012–13 season, another five B Teams, alongside Braga B, where refounded and established themselves in Segunda Liga.

Braga B plays its home games at the Estádio Primeiro de Maio, which holds a capacity of 30,000. It inherited the stadium from the senior team who left there in 2003 following the construction of the Estádio Municipal de Braga.

History

Revival
Prior to the end of the 2011–12 football season in Portugal, seven clubs in the Primeira Liga announced there interest in constructing a B team to fill the six vacant places available to compete in the Segunda Liga for the 2012–13 season. Of those seven, the six clubs which were selected to take part in the competition were the B teams of Benfica, Porto, Sporting CP, Braga, Marítimo and Vitória de Guimarães.

The Portuguese League for Professional Football (LPFP), which organizes the professional football tiers in Portugal, announced that for the clubs to compete in the 2012–13 Segunda Liga, they would have to pay a €50,000 fee. In addition, the LPFP would also require the clubs to follow new rules regarding player selection in which each 'B' team must have a squad of a minimum of ten players who were developed at the club's academy. The LPFP also went on to say that the clubs are unable to compete in cup competitions as well as gaining promotion due to the possibility of playing the senior team. Each 'B' team may have three players above 23 years old.

In late May 2012, it was officially announced that the six Primeira Liga clubs' B teams would compete in the 2012–13 Segunda Liga which would increase the number of teams in the league from 16 to 22 as well as increasing the number of games needed to play in one season from 30 games to 42 games.

Players

Current squad

Other players under contract

Out on loan

Results history

Notable former players

 Eduardo
 Emídio Rafael
 Hélder Sousa
 Jorge Humberto
 Luisinho
 Marco Silva
 Nuno Fonseca
 Paulo Jorge
 Pedro Queirós
 Ricardo Rocha
 Zé Gomes
 Michael Curcija
 William Soares
 Manoel Lemes
 Narcisse Yameogo
 Jon Paul
 Puma
 Zé Luís
 Cícero Semedo
 Abiodun Agunbiade
 Elderson Echiéjilé

Managerial history
  Toni Conceição (July 1999– June 2002)
  António Caldas (June 2002– November 2002)
  Toni Conceição (November 2002– December 2002)
  António Caldas (December 2002– October 2005)
  Micael Sequeira (October 2005– June 2006)
  Artur Jorge (May 2012– October 2012)
  Toni (October 2012– May 2013)
  José Alberto Costa (June 2013– February 2014)
  Bruno Pereira (February 2014– June 2014)
  Fernando Pereira (June 2014– February 2015)
  Abel Ferreira (February 2015– April 2017)
  João Aroso (April 2017– January 2018)
  Wender Said (January 2018– February 2019)
  Rui Santos (February 2019– September 2019)
  Rúben Amorim (September 2019– December 2019)
  Vasco Faísca (December 2019– June 2021)
  Artur Jorge (June 2021– May 2022)
  Custódio Castro (May 2022– )

References

Association football clubs established in 1999
Association football clubs disestablished in 2006
S.C. Braga
Football clubs in Portugal
Portuguese reserve football teams
1999 establishments in Portugal
2006 disestablishments in Portugal
Association football clubs established in 2012
2012 establishments in Portugal
Liga Portugal 2 clubs
Premier League International Cup